Phanord Cabé (born 14 February 1993) is a Haitian Digital Personality and Entrepreneur. He is the Social Media Manager at Radio-Télévision Caraïbes.

Biography
Phanord Cabé was born and grew up in Carrefour. Since 2010, he also works at Digicel as a technician and in 2012 he became head of social networking accounts of Radio-Television Caraïbes and a number of well-known public figures in Haiti.

Founder of the online media Hebdo24, launched on 24 February 2021 and "Cabe Solutions". According to Phanord, "technology is a very important tool to a country's development, even the most important nowadays".

In 2019, the media Juno7 designates him as a personality who has marked the digital sector in Haiti.

See also
 List of Haitians

References

External links
Phanord Cabé Hebdo24 

Living people
1993 births
People from Port-au-Prince